Upananda College Galle, Walahanduwa (officially Upananda Vidalaya; උපනන්ද විද්‍යාලය) is a government Buddhist school in Galle Southern Provence, Sri Lanka. The college was established by Hon. Bataduwe Rathanajothi Thero as a second happiness of Upananda College pinnaduwa village in akmeemana, Galle on 16 January 1910. It has Grade 1 to 13 both Primary school and secondary school.

Inauguration 

In the 20th century, the activities of religious and social upliftment were highlighted in various fields. Specially the guidance of Sri Angarika Dharampala and by culture prevailed after the Pandura Vadaya, Udamvita and Baddegam Vada, the Buddhist vigilance was sharpen. As a result, this Education was the main factor of the social progress and the Buddhist school was opened throughout the country.
The great Buddhist monk Rev. Bataduwe Rathanajothi with the help of the people in the area as foresters started a school with about 10 – 25 students in a cadjan- hut and called it Upananda which means the second happiness.

Physical environment 

Upananda vidyalaya is situated about 8 km (5 miles) away from Galle town in Galle Udugama road. This area is under the zone of south-west monsoon rains and the rain forests. The economy of the people in this area is based on state farming and agriculture. Most of the place here are rural and towns like Pinnaduwa Walahanduwa are developing. It is an eye-catching scenery for and one those Manavila Upananda is situated in a small hill in between the Colombo – Matara speed highway and a sub way.

Community structure 

Though the people lead a rural life, the effect of urbanization also can be seen most of the people in the area are farmers. About 97% of the people are Buddhists while 3% Tamils. There are about 98% of the people are Buddhists.
As a result of situating between two temples the Kalugla Mawatha Mahavihara and the Keththaramay, almost all the students in the school are Buddhist. Then the activities under Buddhist social & cultural are also can be seen very frequently. A way of traditional family society is also not extinct in this area.

National Administrative Factor 
It is belong to the Galle District in Southern Province. According to traditional administration deviation it belongs to Paththu and Galukoralya. Now it belongs to Akmeeman electorate and it governs by the Divisional Secretariat of Akmeemana, and Akmeeman Pradsheeya Sabha further it belong to Manavila Grama Seva Division.

Development 
Starting with 10-15 students in 1910 today it has been developed into a national school with about 2,300 students with all the facilities.

History 
During the 19th century there was a trend to build up Buddhist schools throughout the island. To encourage Buddhism in Galle District Bataduwe Rathanjothi started this school on 10 January 1910. The meaning of Upananda College became the idea of “second happiness” of the Bataduwe Rathanajothi.

The first building of the school was built up from the donation of well-wishers and the labour of the villagers. It was a building of 20 feet long and attached with cajuns. Only 23 students were admitted to the school. The first teacher of the school was A. D. Paranavithana and D. H. Gunasekara was appointed as the first principal of the school.
The school was called many names in the past such as primary school and junior school. In 1949 it was called Upananda Vidyalaya. Upananda vidyalaya had developed day by day under the supervision of various principals. On 1 August 1958 the school was promoted as Upananda Maha Vidyalaya then the government of gave aid to the school. In 1961 prime minister Sirimawo Bandaranayake visited the school to facilitate the science education of the school.
On 18 August 1995 Upananda Maha Vidyalaya was promoted to a national school.

Former principals 

  D. H. Gunasekara (1910 - 1932)
  K. V. G. Silva (1932 - 1940)
  S. L. D. Wanigarathna (1940 - 1946)
  Sumadasa Thilakaratna (1946 - 1949)
  P. G. Daramasiri (1949 - 1958)
  D. Manawadu (1958 - 1693)
  D. L. Senevirathna (1963 - 1969)
  D. R. Wanigarathna (1969 - 1972)
  Noraman De Silva (1972 - 1988)
  Upali Jayasinghe (1988 - 1992)
  D. J. K. Siriwardena (1992 - 1995)
  A. D. A. Gunawardena (1995 - 2001)
  R. S. Jayasekara (2001 - 2004)
  S. M. Jayasekara (2004 - 2011)
  N. M. K. N. Weerasiri (2011–2016)
  D. Kariyawasam (2016–2019)
  Hemapala Andawaththa (2019-present)

See also 
 Upananda College Official web
 Upananda College Blog

Schools in Galle